Zalán Pekler (born 8 February 2000) is a Hungarian sports shooter. He competed in the men's 10 metre air rifle event at the 2020 Summer Olympics.

References

External links
 

2000 births
Living people
Hungarian male sport shooters
Olympic shooters of Hungary
Shooters at the 2020 Summer Olympics
Shooters at the 2018 Summer Youth Olympics
People from Komárom
Sportspeople from Komárom-Esztergom County
21st-century Hungarian people